Grischa (alternatively spelled Grisha or Gricha) is a short form for the name Gregory or Grigorij, and sometimes for the name Georgi as well, used in Russia and some other Slavic countries, including Ukraine and Bulgaria. The "sha" ending is a typical short form in the Russian language for names. Other such short forms include Natasha for Natalia, Sasha for Alexander, Alyosha for Alexei, and Misha for Michael (or Mikhail, which is the Russian spelling).

See also
Names in Russian Empire, Soviet Union and CIS countries
The Case of Sergeant Grischa, the title of a novel by Arnold Zweig

External links
Grischalogie, a Web page that focuses on the roots of the name, where it was first used, and points to several other resources surrounding this unique name.

Given names
Russian masculine given names